Yisroel Meir Gabbai is a Breslover Hasid who travels the world to locate, repair and maintain Jewish cemeteries, kevarim (gravesites) and ohels of Torah notables and tzaddiks. He is the founder of Agudas Ohalei Tzadikim.

Biography 
Gabbai's father was a native of Morocco and his mother a descendant of German Jews; they married in France, where Gabbai was born, on December 11, 1959.

He along with his family later moved to Israel. In his youth, Gabbai attended Yeshivas Lucerne under Rav Yitzchok Dov Koppelman and went on to study in the Ponevezh Yeshiva in Bnei Brak and the Breslov Yeshiva in Jerusalem.

Grave restoration
In 1980, Gabbai traveled to the Soviet Union for the first time to visit the grave of Rebbe Nachman of Breslov in Uman, Ukraine. Upon touring other cities, he was shocked by the degradation and ruin of Jewish holy sites in Russia. During the Soviet era, Jewish gravestones were often uprooted by vandals or by poor people who used the stones for heating and building. In large cities, the Soviets destroyed and paved over entire cemeteries to build sports complexes and other buildings. In 1989, after the fall of Communism, Gabbai began his work of identifying and restoring Jewish holy sites in the Former Soviet Union.

In Medzhybizh, Ukraine, burial place of the Baal Shem Tov, Gabbai was instrumental in refurbishing the Baal Shem Tov's grave and ohel, which also covers the graves of the Degel Machaneh Ephraim, the Apter Rav, and Rabbi Boruch of Medzhybizh. Gabbai also built a large synagogue near the Baal Shem Tov's burial place, a guest house named Holiness and a mikveh. In 2010 he completed the reconstruction of the synagogue of the Apter Rav in Medzhybizh, which was destroyed by fire.

According to his website, Gabbai is active in nearly every Jewish cemetery in Ukraine, renovating, fencing and marking cemeteries which have been paved over for buildings. He also established a permanent ner tamid at the graves of the Baal Shem Tov and Rebbe Nachman of Breslov.

In recent years, Gabbai expanded his activities to include grave restoration work in Syria, Yemen, Turkey and Israel. 

Gabbai calls on many resources in his work. For example, in the restorations in Mezhibuz, he consulted with an elderly Jew living in Ashdod, Israel, who had hid in Mezhibuz as an 18-year-old refugee during World War II, and with a rabbi whose father, the former Rav of the town, had sketched a detailed map that identified important graves and Jewish landmarks. In his quest to identify the unmarked grave of Rashi, he consulted with a French-Jewish philosopher who was able to access academic archives to unearth an ancient map.

Accomplishments
His accomplishments include:
 The identification of the grave of Rabbi Shalom Shabazi in Yemen
 The identification of the grave of Rabbi Refael Katzin, nineteenth-century chief rabbi of Aleppo, in Aleppo, Syria
 Renovation of the grave of Rabbi Naphtali Katz in Istanbul
 The purchase of part of the ancient cemetery in Shepetivka, Ukraine, and the identification and restoration of the grave and ohel of Rabbi Pinchas of Koretz, plus the construction of a nearby guest house
 Identification and restoration of the graves of Abba Hilkiah and Hanan ha-Nehba, both grandchildren of Honi HaM'agel, in northern Israel
 Placement of a plaque at the burial site of Rashi and other Rishonim, alerting visitors that an unmarked square in the city of Troyes, France is in fact part of an ancient Jewish cemetery

Traveling abroad
While Gabbai is a resident of Israel, he also has a French passport which allows him to enter countries hostile to Israel, such as Syria. When he travels, however, he makes no secret of his mission and dresses in full Hasidic regalia, including flat-topped, wide-brim hat, hand-knitted yarmulke, short pants and Hasidic rekel (long coat), in addition to his full beard and payot.

References

External links
Agudas Ohalei Tzaddikim website (English) 
Holiness, the guest house built by Gabbai

Living people
1959 births
Jewish cemeteries
French Orthodox Jews
French emigrants to Israel
Israeli Orthodox Jews
Ponevezh Yeshiva alumni
Israeli people of Moroccan-Jewish descent
Israeli people of German-Jewish descent
Breslov Hasidim